Phineas Chapman Lounsbury (January 10, 1841 - June 22, 1925) was an American politician and the 53rd Governor of Connecticut.

Biography
Lounsbury was born in Ridgefield, Connecticut on January 10, 1841. He worked on his father's farm and attended the local schools. He married Jennie Wright.

Career
In New York City, he secured a position as clerk in a shoe store, and in time familiarized himself with all departments of the business. When the civil war broke out Lounsbury enlisted as a private in the Seventeenth Connecticut Regiment, but after four months' active service was compelled by severe sickness to return, being honorably discharged and recommended for a pension, which he would not accept.

Having laid the foundations for a successful commercial career; he began, upon attaining his majority in 1862, the manufacture of shoes in New Haven under the firm name of Lounsbury Brothers. The business was afterward moved to South Norwalk, and carried on under the firm name of Lounsbury, Matthewson & Co.

Lounsbury became a member of the Connecticut House of Representatives in 1874 and held that position till 1876.

Winning the 1886 Republican gubernatorial nomination, Lounsbury was elected governor by a legislative decision. During his term, he signed the Incorrigible Criminal Act.  He also advocated for instituting a 60-hour work week for women and children under 16.  He did not run for re-election and retired from public service.

After serving as the governor of Connecticut, Lounsbury returned to his business and served as president of the Connecticut Merchants Exchange National Bank. His brother and business partner, George E. Lounsbury, served as governor from 1899 to 1901. In 1883, he built a Great Camp, Echo Camp, on Raquette Lake in the Adirondack.

Death
Lounsbury died in Ridgefield, Connecticut on June 22, 1925.  He is interred at Lounsbury Cemetery, Ridgefield, Fairfield County, Connecticut.

His home, the Phineas Chapman Lounsbury House, was added to the National Register of Historic Places in 1975.

References

Further reading 
 Sobel, Robert and John Raimo. Biographical Directory of the Governors of the United States, 1789-1978. Greenwood Press, 1988. 

1841 births
1925 deaths
Republican Party governors of Connecticut
Republican Party members of the Connecticut House of Representatives
People of Connecticut in the American Civil War
People from Ridgefield, Connecticut